Kenan Judge (born c. 1957) is an American politician. A member of the Democratic Party, he has served as a member of the Iowa House of Representatives from District 27 since 2019.

Career
Judge was born in Ottumwa, Iowa, and raised in Georgetown, an unincorporated area of Monroe County, Iowa. After graduating from Albia High School, Judge began working for HyVee, where he worked for 38 years, eventually becoming an executive. He began campaigning for the District 44 seat of the Iowa House of Representatives in January 2018. He defeated Republican Party candidate Anna Bergman and Libertarian Party candidate Gabriel Thomson in the November 2018 general election. Judge won reelection in 2020, facing Republican Dave Lorenzen and political independent David Stock.

References

21st-century American politicians
Living people
Businesspeople from Iowa
20th-century American businesspeople
Democratic Party members of the Iowa House of Representatives
People from Ottumwa, Iowa
People from Monroe County, Iowa
American business executives
1950s births